Katel is a village, in Sangrampur tehsil of Buldhana district, Maharashtra State, India.

Geography
It is located on east direction from Banoda Eklara on MH State Highway 173 connecting Shegaon - Warwat Bakal - Bawanbir and Tunki. It lies on the banks of Vaan River.

Demographics
 India census, Katel had a population of 890.

Description

The town post office Postal Index Number (PIN code) is 444204 and PIN is shared with Bawanbir, Banoda Eklara, Ladnapur, Sonala post offices.

Some of nearby villages are Tamgaon, Bodkha, Wakana, Ladnapur, Tunki, Sagoda, Palsoda, Dhamangaon, Palsi Zasi, Kolad, Banoda Eklara, Wadgaon Pr Adgaon, Kolad, Kakanwada Bk, Kakanwada Kh, Pimpri Adgaon, Niwana, Warwat Bakal, Jamod, Durgadatiya, Wankhed, Danapur, Hingani Bk, Raikhed, Belkhed, Gadegaon, Tudgaon, Isapur, Malegaon Bazar,

Nearby towns are Sonala, Akot, Sangrampur, Jalgaon Jamod, Telhara, Shegaon
.

References

Villages in Buldhana district